In mathematics, the Atiyah algebroid, or Atiyah sequence, of a principal -bundle  over a manifold , where  is a Lie group, is the Lie algebroid of the gauge groupoid of . Explicitly, it is given by the following short exact sequence of vector bundles over :

It is named after Michael Atiyah, who introduced the construction to study the existence theory of complex analytic connections. It plays a crucial example in the integrability of (transitive) Lie algebroids, and it has applications in gauge theory and geometric mechanics.

Definitions

As a sequence 
For any fiber bundle  over a manifold , the differential  of the projection  defines a short exact sequence

If  is a principal -bundle, then the group  acts on the vector bundles in this sequence.

As a Lie algebroid 

It follows that , while the anchor map  is given by the differential , which is -invariant.

The Atiyah sequence yields a short exact sequence of -modules by taking the space of sections of the vector bundles. In algebraic or analytic contexts, it is often convenient to view the Atiyah sequence as an exact sequence of sheaves of local sections of vector bundles.

Examples 

 the Atiyah algebroid of the principal -bundle  is the Lie algebra 
 the Atiyah algebroid of the principal -bundle  is the tangent algebroid 
 the Atiyah algebroid of the frame bundle of a vector bundle  is the general linear algebroid  (sometimes also called Atiyah algebroid of )

Properties

Transitivity and integrability 
The Atiyah algebroid of a principal -bundle  is always

 transitive (so its unique orbit is the entire  and its isotropy Lie algebra bundle is the associated bundle )
 integrable (to the gauge groupoid of )

Note that these two properties are independent. Integrable Lie algebroids does not need to be transitive; conversely, transitive Lie algebroids (often called abstract Atiyah sequences) are not necessarily integrable.

While any transitive Lie groupoid is isomorphic to some gauge groupoid, not all transitive Lie algebroids are Atiyah algebroids of some principal bundle. Integrability is the crucial property to distinguish the two concepts: a transitive Lie algebroid is integrable if and only if it is isomorphic to the Atiyah algebroid of some principal bundle.

Relations with connections 
Similarly, the curvatures of such connections correspond to the two forms  defined by

Morphisms 
Any morphism  of principal bundles induces a Lie algebroid morphism  between the respective Atiyah algebroids.

References

 .
 , available as arXiv:0905.1226.
 .
 .
 .

Lie algebras